Anglian Radio was a media company based in Ipswich, Suffolk. The group was created after Tindle Radio sold many of its radio stations in the East of England.

To ensure that Travel, News, Events and Promotions remain local, the group was split into five stations which covered the majority of East Anglia and North Essex.

The Beach served The East Anglian coastline including Great Yarmouth, Gorleston-on-Sea, Bradwell, Caister-on-Sea, Hopton-on-Sea and Hemsby in Norfolk and Lowestoft, Beccles, Bungay and Southwold in Suffolk.
Dream 100 served North East Essex. 
North Norfolk Radio served North Norfolk including Fakenham, Sheringham & Cromer.
Radio Norwich 99.9 served Norwich, and surrounding areas. 
Town 102 served Ipswich, Felixstowe, Stowmarket and East Suffolk.

NOTE: During the night time, at weekends, and at times of local News Broadcasts being unavailable, all stations used the services of Sky News Radio for News Summaries.

On 8 January 2017, The Beach and North Norfolk Radio broadcast the last programmes from their local studios in Lowestoft and Stody and from the following day their output originated from the studios of Radio Norwich in Thorpe St Andrew, and was the same on all three stations, with the exception of commercials, individual local travel broadcasts, local events updates, and station idents.

Celador Radio acquired Anglian Radio shortly after, on 31 January 2017.

From 11 September 2017, all five stations were broadcast from the Norwich studios and the Ipswich headquarters were subsequently vacated. A smaller base in Ipswich was acquired for news and sales staff.

On 12 June 2018, Ofcom announced that Town 102 had failed to secure a renewal of its licence and it was therefore assumed that the station would cease to broadcast on 18 October 2018. However, on 1 August 2018 it began simulcasting on the Suffolk DAB multiplex, confirming that its intention was to continue on DAB after the expiry of the FM licence.

References

External links
 http://radiotoday.co.uk/2013/02/tindle-radio-offloads-five-radio-stations/
 http://radiotoday.co.uk/2017/01/celador-radio-takes-control-of-anglian-radio/

Radio broadcasting companies of the United Kingdom
Mass media in Essex
Mass media in Norfolk
Mass media in Suffolk